G.W. Carver Freshman Campus (also called Freshman Academy or The Freshman Campus) is a public high school located at the south end of  Douglas, Georgia, United States. The school mascot is the Trojan. The campus was originally Carver School, and housed grades 1–12.  Later it was Coffee Junior High. Then the junior high was split into two middle schools, and this campus became East Coffee Middle School, housing grades 6–8.  In the fall of 2007 it acquired the name Coffee High School Freshman Campus.  Today it is known as the George Washington Carver Freshman Campus, an extension of Coffee High School.

Activities and clubs
Art Club
Tri-M
4-H
Chorus
FCCLA
Drama Club
Fellowship of Christian Athletes
FFA
Future Business Leaders of America
Key Club
Marching band
Navy JROTC
Student Council
Technology Students Association

Sports
GWC Freshman Campus has teams in the following sports:
Baseball
Basketball
Cheerleading
Cross country
Football
Golf
Soccer
Softball
Swimming
Tennis
Track & field
Wrestling

Band
The GWC Band is part of the Coffee High School Marching Trojans. It is under the direction of Steve Myers, who is also the Band Director of the Coffee High School Band.

References

External links
 
 Coffee County Board of Education

Public high schools in Georgia (U.S. state)
Schools in Coffee County, Georgia